Old Botanical garden is located in Maxvorstadt, Munich, Bavaria, Germany.

Description
The old botanical garden is located on Lenbachplatz in Munich in the district part Königsplatz of Maxvorstadt and is now a park . It is bounded on the south by a straight 360 meter section of the Elisenstraße and on the other sides by the arc shaped Sophienstraße. On the south side, on the opposite side of Elisenstraße lie the grounds of the Palace of Justice and in the northwest The Charles Hotel. The site occupies an area of about four hectares.

It was created between 1804 and 1812 according to plans from the landscape architect Friedrich Ludwig von Sckell and opened on 23 May 1812. At that time, the garden was under the direction of Franz von Paula von Schrank. The landmark neo-classical entrance portal at Lenbachplatz was designed by the Portuguese architect Emanuel Joseph d'Herigoyen and built in 1812.

The inscription on the entrance portal (by Johann Wolfgang von Goethe): 
FLORVM DAEDALAE TELLVRIS GENTES DISSITAE 
Maximiliani IOS. R. NOMINE CONSOCIATE, MDCCCXII 
("The flowers over the earth scattered genera, united here at the behest of King Maximilian Joseph 1812").

In 1854 the International Industrial Exhibition Munich Glass Palace was built on the north side of the park. This was destroyed by fire in 1931. During the Winter seasons 1931/32 and 1932/33 an ice rink was built in place of the glass palace where the final round of the German Ice Hockey Championship 1933 was held.

In 1914, the new Botanical Garden in Nymphenburg on the former outskirts of Munich was created. Subsequently, in 1937, after a sketch by Paul Troost and plans from the architect Oswald Bieber and the sculptor Joseph Wackerle the old botanical garden was turned into a park. Additions included the Neptune fountain in the middle of the park and a cafe in historic style, today's Park Café. In addition a small exhibition building was built, the Kunstpavillon. It was badly damaged in World War II, later rebuilt by self-help Munich artists. Today the pavilion is used for exhibitions of contemporary visual art.

The continued existence in the park of many exotic trees hark to the original function of the Old Botanical Garden.

Photos

External links 

 200 Jahre Alter Botanischer Garten
 Kunstpavillon im Alten Botanischen Garten am Stachus

Literature 
 Margret Wanetschek: Grünanlagen in der Stadtplanung von München. 1790–1860. Neu herausgegeben von Klaus Bäumler und Franz Schiermeier. Franz Schiermeier Verlag, München 2005, .
 Botanischer Garten München und Gesellschaft der Freunde des Botanischen Gartens (Hrsg.): Botanischer Garten München. MünchenVerlag, München 2014, .

References 

Buildings and structures in Munich
Maxvorstadt
Munich
Parks and open spaces in Munich